Katharine McMahon is an historical novelist who, since 1990, has published ten books. Her latest, The Hour of Separation, was released in paperback in 2019. McMahon is the best-selling author of The Rose of Sebastopol which was officially announced on 27 December 2007 as one of the ten titles for the Richard & Judy Book Club 2008. McMahon’s book was subsequently reviewed on the Channel 4 Richard & Judy Show on 24 January 2008. The Rose of Sebastopol was shortlisted for the Best Read Award at the Galaxy British Book Awards 2008. In 2020 the book was released in a new edition with an additional chapter, to commemorate the 200th anniversary of Florence Nightingale. 

The Rose of Sebastopol was on the Sunday Times Best Seller List and was a Waterstone's No.1 Bestseller. McMahon's previous book The Alchemist's Daughter was one of Waterstone's Paperbacks of the Year in 2006.

In two subsequent novels, The Crimson Rooms, and The Woman in the Picture, McMahon introduced the character Evelyn Gifford, a pioneering female lawyer who struggles to gain a foothold in the legal world during the 1920s.

Background 
McMahon studied English and Drama at University of Bristol and qualified as a teacher of English and Drama. Initially she worked in secondary education, but was later appointed as a writing fellow by the Royal Literary Fund at the University of Hertfordshire and University of Warwick. She currently works with the Royal Literary Fund as Head of Outreach.

She has worked as a tutor at the Arvon Foundation, and for several years taught the Guardian masterclass on Historical Fiction.

Criminal Justice System 

McMahon also trained as a magistrate in Hertfordshire and North London.  She was appointed as course director by the Judicial College to design and run the national training course for Bench Chairmen. For five years she served on the Sentencing Council for England and Wales 2010-2015 and was subsequently appointed as a Judicial Appointments Commissioner. (2014-2017)

Latest Audio  
BBC Front Row July 2020 - discussing Watford's One Town One Book, and the Hour of Separation
Lockdown Litfest 2020
Scrapbooks are Out of Fashion - a discussion of a newly digitised scrapbook on Florence Nightingale

Books 
The Hour of Separation (UK paperback) Weidenfeld & Nicolson 2019 
The Hour of Separation (UK Hardback) Weidenfeld & Nicolson 2018 
The Woman in the Picture (UK paperback) Weidenfeld & Nicolson 30 July 2015 
Writing Historical Fiction: A 60-Minute Masterclass (Guardian Masterclasses Book 7) The Guardian 2014
The Woman in the Picture Weidenfeld & Nicolson 3 July 2014 
Season of Light Weidenfeld & Nicolson 10 November 2011 
The Crimson Rooms (US paperback release) Berkley Trade 4 January 2011 
The Crimson Rooms (US release) Putnam Adult 1 February 2010 
The Crimson Rooms Weidenfeld & Nicolson 11 June 2009 
The Rose of Sebastopol Weidenfeld & Nicolson 2007 
The Alchemist's Daughter Weidenfeld & Nicolson 2006 
After Mary Flamingo 2000, paperback 2001 
Confinement (Re-released) Phoenix 11 June 2009 
Confinement Flamingo 1998, paperback 1999 
Footsteps (Re-released) Phoenix 2008 
Footsteps Flamingo 1997, paperback 1998 
A Way through the Woods Sinclair Stevenson 1989, Bantam Books 1992

References

External links 
 Official website
 Author as magistrate - McMahon's article 'A Foot in Another World' for the Magistrates' Association

British historical novelists
Alumni of the University of Bristol
Academics of the University of Hertfordshire
Academics of the University of Warwick
People educated at North London Collegiate School
Year of birth missing (living people)
Living people
Writers from London